Štôla is a village and small municipality in Poprad District in the Prešov Region of northern Slovakia. It lies on the foothills of High Tatras.

History
In historical records the village was first mentioned in 1330.

Geography
The municipality lies at an altitude of 840 metres and covers an area of 2.555 km². It has a population of about 550 people.

Economy and infrastructure
The village has a developed touristic infrastructure with several types and categories of accommodation. Cultural sightseeing is neo-classical evangelical church from 19th century.

References

External links
http://stola.e-obce.sk

Villages and municipalities in Poprad District